Mehla is a town in central Liberia.  Its elevation in 252m.

Transport 
It lies near the iron ore railway from Nimba to the port of Buchanan.
Nimba, Liberia

See also 
 Railway stations in Liberia

References 

Populated places in Liberia
Nimba County